The Lincoln Continental is a series of mid-sized and full-sized luxury cars produced by Lincoln, a division of the American automaker Ford Motor Company.  The model line was introduced following the construction of a personal vehicle for Edsel Ford, who commissioned a coachbuilt 1939 Lincoln-Zephyr convertible, developed as a vacation vehicle to attract potential Lincoln buyers. In what would give the model line its name, the exterior was given European "continental" styling elements, including a rear-mounted spare tire.

In production for over 55 years across nine different decades, Lincoln has produced ten generations of the Continental. Within the Lincoln model line, the Continental has served several roles ranging from its flagship to its base-trim sedan. From 1961 to 1976, Lincoln sold the Continental as its exclusive model line.  The model line has also gone on hiatus three times. From 1949 to 1955, the nameplate was briefly retired. In 1981, the Continental was renamed the Lincoln Town Car to accommodate the 1982 seventh-generation Continental.  After 2002, the Continental was retired, largely replaced by the Lincoln MKS in 2009; in 2017, the tenth-generation Continental replaced the MKS.

As part of its entry into full-scale production, the first-generation Continental was the progenitor of an entirely new automotive segment, the personal luxury car.  Following World War II, the segment evolved into coupes and convertibles larger than sports cars and grand touring cars with an emphasis on features, styling, and comfort over performance and handling. From 1956 to 1957, the Continental nameplate was the namesake of the short-lived Continental Division, marketing the 1956–1957 Continental Mark II as the worldwide flagship of Ford Motor Company; as a second successor, Ford introduced the Continental Mark series in 1969, produced over six generations to 1998.

Along with the creation of the personal luxury car segment, the Lincoln Continental marked the zenith of several designs in American automotive history. The Continental is the final American vehicle line with a factory-produced V12 engine (1948), the final four-door convertible (1967), and the final model line to undergo downsizing (for the 1980 model year).

American production of the Continental and MKZ, its only two sedans, ended in 2020 thereby making Lincoln a crossover/SUV-only brand in the USA.  After it was discontinued in Lincoln's home market, Ford indicated that it planned to move Continental production to China.

Edsel Ford prototype (1939)
The Lincoln Continental began life as a personal vehicle for Ford Motor Company President Edsel Ford.  In 1938, Ford commissioned a one-off design he wanted ready for his March 1939 vacation from company Chief Stylist Eugene T. "Bob" Gregorie. Using the blueprints of the streamlined Lincoln-Zephyr as a starting point, Gregorie sketched a design for a convertible with a redesigned body; allegedly, the initial sketch for the design was completed in an hour.

At the time work had begun on the first Continental coupe, Lincoln had previously cancelled the Lincoln K-series coupes, sedans, and limousines, and produced the very limited Lincoln Custom limousine, along with the smaller Lincoln-Zephyr coupes and sedans, while the all-new Mercury Eight was also introduced in 1939. Ford wanted to revive the popularity of the 1929–1932 Lincoln Victoria coupe and convertible but with a more modern approach, reflecting European styling influences for the Continental.

By design, the Edsel Ford prototype was essentially a channelled and sectioned Lincoln-Zephyr convertible; although the vehicle wore a conventional windshield profile, the prototype sat nearly 7 inches lower than a standard Lincoln. Along with the massive decrease in height, the running boards were deleted entirely. In contrast to the Zephyr (and in a massive change from the K-Series Lincoln), the hood sat nearly level with the fenders taking advantage of the fact that the engine type and configuration did not need the clearance afforded by the height of the standard Lincoln hood line. To focus on the styling of the car, the chrome trim on the car was largely restricted to the grille; the prototype differed from the eventual production version in that it utilized a somewhat less angular roof line. As with the Lincoln-Zephyr, the prototype utilized a 267 cubic-inch V12 engine, transverse leaf springs front and rear as well as hydraulic drum brakes.

The design would introduce two long-running features used in many American automobile designs. The modified body gave the design new proportions over its Zephyr counterpart; with the hoodline sitting lower over the V12 engine and the passenger compartment moved rearward, the prototype had more in common with classic era "long-hood, short deck" body configurations versus being a strict adherent of contemporary streamline moderne design trends. As a consequence of the smaller trunk space, the spare tire was mounted behind the trunk; while disappearing on American cars, the externally mounted, covered spare tire remained a feature on European-produced cars.

The prototype designed by Gregorie was produced on time, making the deadline to be delivered to Edsel Ford in Florida. Interest from well-off friends was high; Edsel sent a telegram back to Michigan that he could sell a thousand of them. In reference to its European-inspired design, the Lincoln-based prototype received its name: Continental.

Immediately, production commenced on the Lincoln Continental, with the majority of production being "Cabriolet" convertibles and a rare number of coupes. These were extensively hand-built; the two dozen 1939 models and 400 1940-built examples were built with hand-hammered body panels; dies for machine-pressing were not constructed until 1941. The limited number of 1939 models produced are commonly referred to as '1940 Continentals'.

First generation (1940–1942, 1946-1948)

Lincoln Continentals from 1939 to 1941 shared largely the same body design with each other with push-button door catch releases displacing the previous lever type handles for 1941; the Continental received minimal updates from year to year.

For the 1942 model year, all Lincoln models were given squared-up fenders, and a revised grille with the Lincoln-Zephyr now gaining the exterior push-button door catch releases. The result was a boxier, more massive appearance in keeping with then-current design trends, but perhaps less graceful in retrospect. 1942 production was shortened, following the entry of the United States into World War II; the attack on Pearl Harbor led to the suspension of production of automobiles for civilian use.

After World War II, the Lincoln division of Ford returned the Continental to production as a 1946 model; Lincoln dropped the Zephyr nomenclature following the war, so the postwar Continental was derived from the standard Lincoln (internally H-Series). To attract buyers, the design was refreshed with updated trim, distinguished by a new grille. For 1947, walnut wood trim was added to the interior.

Following the death of Edsel Ford in 1943, Ford Motor Company re-organized its corporate management structure, which led to the 1946 departure of the Continental's designer Bob Gregorie. That year's Continental, the first postwar model, was designed by famed industrial stylist Raymond Loewy. 1948 would become the last year for the Continental, as the division sought to redevelop its new 1949 model line as an upgraded version of the Mercury; the expensive personal-luxury car no longer had a role at Lincoln.

The 1939–1948 Continental is recognized as a "Full Classic" by the Classic Car Club of America, one of the last-built cars to be so recognized. As of 2015, the 1948 Lincoln Continental and 1948 Lincoln were the last cars produced and sold by a major U.S. automaker with a V12 engine.  Base retail price for the coupe was listed at US$2,727 and the cabriolet was listed at US$2,778.

Second generation (1956–1957)

After an eight-year hiatus, for the 1956 model year, the Continental nameplate made its return; to launch the vehicle, Ford created a namesake "Continental" division centered around its new flagship vehicle.  To again highlight the European influence of the original Continental, Ford assigned the Mark II suffix to the new Continental (also in an effort to distinguish itself from the similar Bentley Continental). Slotted well above Lincoln-Mercury, Continentals would be marketed and serviced through the Lincoln dealership network.

At its 1956 launch, the Continental Mark II was the most expensive automobile sold by a domestic manufacturer in the United States, rivaling the Rolls-Royce Silver Cloud.  At $10,000  ($ in  dollars ) the Mark II cost nearly the same as five Ford Customlines. With a large number of power-equipment features included, the Mark II was offered with only a single option: air conditioning, priced at $595.

On a unique, low-slung chassis sharing only its 126-inch wheelbase dimension with the Lincoln Capri and Premiere, the Mark II was assembled with its own body panels and interior; each vehicle was hand-built, with hand-sanding and finishing of body panels. In several elements of its design the Mark II broke from American styling precedent. As with a Rolls-Royce or Mercedes-Benz 300d, the Mark II essentially restricted chrome trim to the window trim, grille, and bumpers. With a nearly flat hood and trunklid, the Mark II was also designed with neither tailfins (then prominent on American sedans) nor pontoon fenders (then current in Europe). Rather than a separate assemblage the "Continental spare tire" was now integrated into the deck lid stamping, serving to accommodate the vertically-mounted spare tire beneath.

In total, 2,996 Continental Mark IIs were produced including two prototype convertibles.  As a consequence of the nearly hand-built construction, Ford estimated it lost nearly $1000 on every Continental Mark II produced.  After 1957, the Mark II was discontinued; the Continental Division was re-branded as a competitor to Imperial and Cadillac rather than Rolls-Royce and Bentley.

Third generation (1958–1960)

To build a better business case for its flagship and the division that marketed the vehicle, the Continental model line underwent extensive changes for the 1958 model year. To widen its sales potential, Ford required Continental to reach a $6,000 price point ($ in  dollars ) (a 40% reduction from the Mark II), allowing the division to better compete against Cadillac Eldorado and Imperial LeBaron.  To allow for production at a larger scale, the Continental model line was more closely integrated with Lincoln, differing primarily in roofline, trim, and grille. For 1959, Ford cancelled the Continental division outright, with its model line remaining through the 1960 model year as part of the model cycle.

The first all-new unibody design since World War II, this generation of the Continental is one of the largest sedans ever built by Ford Motor Company (or any American automaker).

Development
To facilitate continuation of the Continental model line, the division was forced to abandon hand-built construction. Sharing a common chassis and much of the exterior of the Lincoln Premiere, Continental production shifted to the then-new Wixom Assembly plant.

To set itself apart from a Lincoln, along with a division-specific grille, all versions of the Continental (including convertibles) were styled with a reverse-slant roofline, fitted with a retractable "breezeway" rear window. First introduced on the 1957 Mercury Turnpike Cruiser, the feature allowed for augmented interior ventilation (along with air conditioning). Unlike the Turnpike Cruiser, the reverse slant of the roofline included the rear window, an element that would reappear on Mercury sedans in the next decade.

The Continental Mark III was designed by John Najjar, Chief Stylist of Lincoln, assisted by Elwood Engel largely drawing influence from the 1955 Ford La Tosca concept model designed by Alex Tremulis.  Engel would style the 1959 Mark IV, with Don Delarossa (who replaced Najjar as Lincoln Chief Stylist in 1957) developing the 1960 Mark V.  As a result of its massive size and the configuration of its headlights, the model line was nicknamed the "slant-eyed monster" in the Ford design studio.

Chassis/body
The 1958–1960 Continental Mark III–V are built upon the same mechanical components utilized by the Lincoln Capri and Premiere.  For 1958, Lincoln split further from Mercury in body design as part of ongoing efforts to outdo Cadillac, with Lincoln adopting unibody construction for the first time; the Continental shared a common body with the Premiere with the exception of the reverse-slant roofline.

Shared with Lincoln, Mercury, and the Ford Thunderbird, the Continental Mark III–V were fitted with a 430 cubic-inch MEL V8 engine; a 3-speed Turbo-Drive automatic was the sole transmission. In 1958, the engine produced 375 hp, and was detuned to 350 hp in 1959, making 315 hp in 1960.

Using a 131-inch wheelbase, the 1958 Continentals are the longest-wheelbase sedans ever built by Ford Motor Company. Longer than a Ford Excursion, the 1958–1960 Continentals are the longest sedans ever produced by Ford without 5 mph bumpers. The 1958 Continental Mark III convertible is the longest convertible ever mass-produced in the United States, with the sole exception of the rare 1934–1937 Cadillac V16 convertibles.

Models
In line with the previous Continental naming tradition, Continental introduced its 1958 model line as the Mark III. In a break from previous practice, the two subsequent model years were marketed as incrementally increased "marks" (Marks IV and V).

Mark III (1958)
For 1958, Continental released the Mark III in four body styles, including a 2-door hardtop and convertible, a 4-door pillared sedan, and a four-door hardtop sedan called Landau. Although far less expensive than the Mark II, the Mark III remained well-equipped, retaining air conditioning as an option which was relocated from the ceiling to the dashboard.  The Mark III became the first Ford Motor Company vehicle to offer an FM radio tuner; it was a rarely ordered option.  A unique option was "Auto Lube", allowing for the car to lubricate itself as long as an oil reservoir was kept full.

Mark IV (1959)
For 1959, the Continental Mark IV saw a minor restyling, with the elimination of Dagmars from the front bumpers and side sculpting becoming much less deeply drawn. Coinciding with the end of the Continental Division, "Continental III" fender badging is replaced by separate "Continental" and "Mark IV" badging. The grille is restyled slightly, with the headlight clusters now integrated into the egg-crate grille.

Mark V (1960)
For 1960, the Continental Mark V saw another styling update, with flatter front bumpers (with Dagmars). The Continental badging was restyled, with "Mark V" badging moved to the rear fenders. On the front fenders, four horizontal chrome spears were added. Using a similar layout as the Mark IV, the Mark V was given a restyled grille. The 1960 Continental features a beautiful one year only restyled dashboard. The rear grille and bumper were also completely restyled setting it apart from the previous two years. The rear suspension was changed from coil spring to leaf springs, the fusebox was placed under the hood for ease of access and cruise control was offered for the first time.

Town Car/Limousine
Alongside the Mark III, IV, and V, there are two additional models of the third-generation Continental. In 1959, Lincoln added the Limousine and Town Car body styles; the latter marked the first use of the Town Car name by Lincoln. Available only in black, both versions were built with a model-specific formal rear roofline with a padded vinyl roof and smaller rear window for privacy. The Limousine featured a retractable partition between the front and rear seats with a rear seat radio on the back of the front seat. The wheelbase remained the same 131 inches on the limousine as the other Continental models and the rear seating was also the same dimensions. Priced at $10,230 for the limousine and $9207 for the Town Car, these cars came equipped with every optional accessory offered that year. The air conditioning capacity was increased with the addition of a trunk mounted evaporator to increase rear seat cooling.

The 1959–1960 Town Car and Limousine are among the rarest Lincoln vehicles ever sold; only 214 examples of the $9,200 Town Car were produced and only 83 examples of the $10,200 Limousine were produced.

Nameplate reuse
Nearly 40% lower in price than the Continental Mark II, the Mark III would go on to sell better than the Mark II predecessor. From 1958 to 1960, the Lincoln Division would lose over $60 million; along with the launch of newly developed vehicles in a recession economy, a factor that contributed to the downfall of the Edsel line. Lincoln and Continental were faced with overcoming the expense of developing a vehicle that was shared with neither Ford nor Mercury.

In 1961, as Lincoln redesigned its model line, the Continental went from being a  flagship marque over Lincoln to the only model line sold by Lincoln for the next 16 years. In the mid-1960s, Ford made a decision to develop a new successor to the Mark II, naming it the Continental Mark III, effectively continuing the Mark series. As with the Mark II and the 1958–1960 Continentals, it was sold, marketed, and serviced by Lincoln, though not officially badged as such. As part of the launch, the existence of the 1958 Continental Mark III that shared its name was heavily downplayed; a second nickname to this generation is dubbed the "forgotten Marks"

Fourth generation (1961–1969)

For the 1961 model year the Lincoln range was consolidated into one model. Following the $60 million in losses ($ in  dollars ) to develop the 1958–1960 cars, all models were replaced by a new Lincoln Continental. Making its first appearance since 1948, the fourth-generation was available only as a four-door sedan and convertible until its 1966 model year refresh. The 1961 four-door sedan was listed at US$6,067 ($ in  dollars ) and manufactured 22,303 while the convertible was listed at US$6,713 ($ in  dollars ) and manufactured 2,857.

The new generation was nearly 15 inches shorter overall with a 8" shorter wheelbase over its predecessor, though heavier than its Cadillac or Imperial counterparts.  Its construction and post-build quality control reflected Ford corporate management's commitment to quality.

The 1961 Lincoln Continental and its designers received a bronze medal by the Industrial Design Institute (IDI) of New York, NY. It also won Car Life's 1961 Engineering Excellence Award.

Development
The fourth-generation Lincoln Continental was styled by Ford design vice president Elwood Engel. In mid-1958, Lincoln was struggling against Cadillac, with its lack of profitability putting the future of the division at risk.  In 1958, Engel developed a proposal for the 1961 Ford Thunderbird with staffers Howard Payne and John Orfe in 1958.  While the proposal was not selected for the Thunderbird, the design interested Ford executives to the point of desiring the vehicle as a four-door Lincoln.

At the time of the approval, Ford product planners had come to two conclusions critical to restoring the Lincoln Division to profitability. First, to instill design continuity, Lincoln would adopt a model cycle distinct from Ford or Mercury, moving from three years to eight or nine.  Second, the 1958 Lincoln model line was too large for a standard-length sedan; consequently, the 1961 Lincoln would have to decrease its exterior footprint.

Chassis
The fourth-generation Lincoln Continental rode on a stretched version of the unibody platform produced for the 1961 Thunderbird, lengthened to a 123-inch wheelbase from market launch to 1963. This was then extended to 126 inches and retained until 1969.

The only engine available was the  MEL V8 carried over from the Mark V. It was expanded to 462 cubic inches on 1966 models, becoming the largest-displacement engine ever used in a Ford Motor Company passenger car. A new engine, the  385-series-based V8, took its place by 1969, shared with the Continental Mark III. All versions of the Continental were fitted with a 3-speed automatic transmission.  New for 1966 was Ford's C6 automatic, designed for use in big block, high-horsepower V8 engines.

Body
At its launch, the fourth-generation Lincoln Continental was offered solely as a four-door, as either a sedan or a convertible. For the first time on a Lincoln since 1951, rear doors were rear-hinged (suicide doors). To alert drivers of open doors, Lincoln fitted the dashboard with a "Door Ajar" warning light as seen on many modern automobiles. Latching  at the B-pillar with a vacuum-operated central locking system, convertibles used an abbreviated pillar while sedans were "pillared hardtops.” In the configuration, a thin B-pillar supported the roof structure while all four doors utilized frameless door glass in the style of a hardtop or convertible; the layout would become used by several Ford Motor Company sedans during the 1960s and 1970s.

In what would be the first four-door convertible from a major American manufacturer after World War II, the Lincoln Continental convertible was fitted with a power-operated top on all examples. Deriving its mechanism from the Ford Fairlane 500 Skyliner hardtop convertible, the Continental was fitted with a fabric roof that stored under a rear-hinged deck lid/filler panel. In a similar fashion as the Skyliner, to access the trunk for storage, the deck lid was opened electrically without raising or lowering the roof.

Due to the overlap of the front- and rear-door window weatherstripping on the four-door convertibles (with "suicide" doors), to open the rear door when the front door was closed required that the rear-door window be slightly lowered first. This was accomplished automatically using sensors and relay-controlled logic—when the outside door latch button or inside handle was first pressed, the power-operated window lowered a few inches, then raised when the door was closed.

An option for 1964–1965 was the vertically adjustable steering column. Unlike most tilt-adjustable columns that employ a lever-activated locking pivot joint just behind the steering wheel the Lincoln version employed a vacuum-actuated clamp, a dash-mounted height indicator window and a pivot point further down the column.

Model timeline
During its production, the fourth-generation Lincoln Continental would be produced in three versions, undergoing model revisions in 1964 and 1966.

1961–1963
The 1961 Lincoln Continental was introduced with four-door sedan and four-door convertible versions, replacing the Lincoln Premiere and Lincoln Continental Mark V. For the first time in a car manufactured in the United States, the Lincoln Continental was sold with a 2 year/  bumper-to-bumper warranty. California walnut veneer was used on the doors and instrument panel.

For 1962, a simpler front grille design with floating rectangles and a thin center bar replaced the heavy-gauge, Thunderbird-like, high mounted bumper of the '61.

For 1963, the Continental underwent several functional updates. The front seatbacks were modified in an effort to increase rear seat legroom. To increase luggage space, the trunklid was reshaped. In line with a number of vehicles in the United States, the electrical charging system introduced an alternator, replacing the generator.

1964–1965
For 1964, the Lincoln Continental underwent its first mid-cycle redesign. Alongside styling updates, several functional changes were focused towards increasing rear-seat space. The wheelbase was increased from 123 to 126 inches, shifting the rear seats backward. The roofline underwent several changes, with the adoption of flat side glass (replacing curved window glass). To increase rear headroom, the rear roofline became additionally squared off, in a notchback style.

In a slight exterior restyling, to eliminate the "electric shaver" appearance, the front fascia added vertical chrome accents to the grille; the recessed rear grille was replaced by a much simpler decklid with trim panel (moving the fuel-filler door to the left-rear fender). The interior was completely revised with a full-width instrument panel, updated upholstery patterns, door panels and fittings.

In 1964, Lincoln debuted the Continental Town Brougham concept car, which had a 131 in. wheelbase, overall length at 221.3, and had a retractable glass partition between the front and rear compartments, with an exposed area over the front compartment, in typical 1930s style town car/brougham appearance.

For 1965, Lincoln made additional updates to the Continental. In a styling change, the convex "electric shaver" front fascia was replaced by a more angular blunt hood with an upright flat grille design. As part of the redesign, the front turn signals and parking lights are moved from the front bumpers to wraparound lenses on the front fenders, with similar parking lights/turn signals on the rear; all four lights received metal trim to match the horizontal lines of the new grille. To improve braking ability, the Continental was given Kelsey-Hayes disc brakes for the front wheels; in addition, front seat belts with retractors became standard.

1966–1969
For 1966, the fourth-generation Lincoln Continental underwent a second mid-cycle redesign. To better compete against the Cadillac Coupe de Ville and the Imperial Crown Coupe, Lincoln introduced its first two-door pillarless hardtop since 1960. The convertible remained offered solely as a four-door. In an effort to increase sales of the five year-old model range, Lincoln reduced the price of the Continental nearly $600 from 1965 while keeping equipment levels identical.  The marketing decision proved successful; boosted by the introduction of the two-door body style, the model range increased sales by 36%.

While following much of the 1965 restyling (distinguished in '66 largely by a new grille and the addition of "Continental" to the hood), the 1966 Lincoln Continental wore an all new body, growing 5 inches longer (implemented primarily in the rear seats to accommodate more legroom), and nearly an inch taller and wider. Curved side glass made its return (with less obvious tumblehome, to increase interior room). To offer an engine sized comparably to those in the Imperial (440 cubic inches in 1966) and Cadillac (429 cubic inches, 472 cubic inches in 1968), the 430 V8 was enlarged to 462 cubic inches.

The convertible underwent several equipment revisions for the first time, adding a glass rear window and the top mechanism added a second hydraulic pump for opening the convertible roof and the trunklid (making the two systems separate); hydraulic solenoids were deleted from the top mechanism. The interior underwent several revisions, adding a tilt steering wheel and an 8-track tape player as options.

For 1967, the Lincoln Continental was given only minor trim updates, with the deletion of the Lincoln star emblem from the front fenders being the largest change. Several functional changes were made, as Lincoln added a number of indicator lights to the dashboard. Along with an oil pressure warning light, the dashboard was given indicator lights for an open trunk and the cruise control (if on).  Following federal safety mandates, lap safety seatbelts became standard equipment, coupled with an energy-absorbing steering column.

Following years of decreasing sales, 1967 marked the final year of the Lincoln Continental convertible, with only 2,276 sold.  After becoming the first four-door convertible sold after World War II, the Lincoln Continental would become the final (as of the 2018 model year) example of its type sold by an American manufacturer. As a result of numerous frame reinforcements required by the lack of a fixed roof, the  1967 Lincoln Continental convertible is one of the heaviest passenger cars ever sold by Ford Motor Company.

For 1968, Lincoln made several styling changes to the Continental. To meet federal safety standards, the parking lights, taillights, and front turn signals were returned to a wraparound design on the fenders to satisfy Federal standards for side marker lights. For the interior, torso seatbelts were added for the outboard front seats. The "Continental" wording was removed from the front fascia, replaced by the Lincoln star emblem (as seen on the rear); the hood ornament was deleted, in anticipation of a federal ban on the feature (which never came to effect). The new  Ford "Lima" engine was to be available at the beginning of the model year, but there were so many  Ford MEL engine engines still available, the 460 was phased in later that year. In April, the new Mark III made its debut, as a 1969 model. Total sales would be down to just 39,134.

For 1969, few changes were made in the final year of production. To comply with federal regulations, the front seats were updated with head restraints for the outboard passengers.  The front fascia was updated, with the grille enlarged for the first time since 1966, with the "Continental" wording returning above the grille. Shared with the Mark III, the 460 V8 became the sole engine for the Lincoln Continental, paired with the Ford C6 3-speed automatic transmission.

After a nine-year hiatus, the Town Car name made a return in 1969 as part of an interior trim option package for the Continental.

Presidential state cars 

The Secret Service acquired two versions of the fourth-generation Lincoln Continental for use as a Presidential state car, serving from 1961 to 1977.

SS-100-X is a 1961 Lincoln Continental limousine modified by Hess & Eisenhardt of Cincinnati, Ohio. Designed as an open car with a series of tops for inclement weather, the car was rebuilt with a permanent roof, armoring, and bulletproof glass following the 1963 assassination of John F. Kennedy. Subsequently, all United States presidential limousines have been constructed as armored vehicles.

The Secret Service acquired a 1969 Lincoln Continental limousine for Richard Nixon; although an armored vehicle, the limousine roof was designed with a sunroof to allow President Nixon to stand in the vehicle to greet crowds in a motorcade.

Sales

Fifth generation (1970–1979)

For the 1970 model year, Lincoln introduced the fifth-generation Lincoln Continental. Building on the success of the Mark III introduced the year before, Lincoln sought to modernize the Continental for the 1970s after a nine-year production run.

Although shorter in wheelbase and slightly narrower than 1958–1960 Lincolns, the addition of 5-mph bumpers make 1977–1979 Lincolns the longest automobiles ever produced by Ford Motor Company.

Chassis
The fifth-generation Lincoln Continental reverted back to body-on-frame construction, the first Lincoln to do so since 1957. To save on its engineering and development costs, the Continental was no longer given its own chassis, instead given a longer-wheelbase version of the Mercury Marquis chassis (stretched from 124 inches to 127 inches; 1974–1979 vehicles received a 127.2-inch wheelbase). The 1974 four-door sedan was listed at US$8,238 ($ in  dollars ) and 29,351 were sold.

Shared with the LTD and Marquis, the Continental was equipped with coil springs at all four corners. From 1970 to 1974, the Continental was fitted with front disc and rear drum brakes; from 1975 to 1979, four-wheel disc brakes were available.

The 460 cubic-inch V8 returned as the standard engine, becoming available from 1970 to 1977; from 1970 to 1972, the 460 remained exclusive to Lincoln. In an effort to increase fuel economy and comply with emissions standards, Lincoln added a 400 cubic-inch V8 for California for 1977, with the 460 remaining available in 49 states. For 1978, the 400 became standard (with the 460 as an option), with the 460 discontinued for 1979. Both engines were paired with the Ford C6 3-speed automatic transmission.

Body
In a major departure from its fourth-generation predecessor, the 1970 Lincoln Continental's Marquis-based frame forced the sedan to abandon "suicide doors" for conventional front-hinged doors. As with its predecessor and the Mercury Marquis, the Lincoln Continental was offered as a two-door hardtop and as a four-door "pillared hardtop" sedan (B-pillar with frameless door glass). Unlike Ford or Mercury, no Lincoln two-door convertible was introduced.

Shared with the Mark series, the fifth-generation Continental was equipped with vacuum-operated hidden headlamps; as a fail-safe, the headlamp doors were designed to open in the event of failure (a dashboard indicator light indicated their status).

Model timeline
During its production, the fifth-generation Lincoln Continental was sold in two versions, with a major revision in 1975. Following the downsizing of the full-size General Motors and Chrysler product lines, the Lincoln Continental became the largest mass-market automobile produced worldwide for the 1977 model year. It was surpassed only by purpose-built limousines such as the long-wheelbase version of the Mercedes-Benz 600, the Rolls-Royce Phantom VI, and the ZIL-4104. Following the 1979 downsizing of the Ford LTD and Mercury Marquis, the Lincoln Continental was marketed as the final "traditional" or "large" sedan in the United States.

1970–1974
For 1970, Lincoln introduced a redesigned Continental two-door, Continental four-door, and Continental Town Car; sold only as a four-door, the Town Car was distinguished by a vinyl roof.

For 1971, the grille underwent a minor styling change, partially in an effort to better distinguish the Continental from the Mercury Marquis. The grille and headlight doors were redesigned, with the latter painted in body color. Rear-wheel ABS brakes (called Sure-Trak) was optional.

For 1972, several functional changes were made, as the 460 V8 decreased in compression; though intended to decrease emissions and adapt to unleaded gasoline, output dropped. The tradition of Lincoln-exclusive engines came to an end, as Mercury began use of the 460 in the Mercury Marquis and Colony Park as an option. Minor styling changes were made, as the grille and the fenders were restyled; to better separate the Continental from the Mark IV, Lincoln reintroduced chrome fender trim. For the first time since 1967, the Continental was equipped with a hood ornament. On the inside, more rear seat legroom was added.

For 1973, the Lincoln Continental was brought into compliance with federal crash regulations as it was fitted with a 5-mph front bumper. While a number of vehicles underwent significant revisions to comply with the regulation, the Continental was able to meet the standard by moving its front bumper several inches forward and fitting it with rubber-tipped impact overriders. The rear bumper was modified in a similar manner, with a 2 1/2 mph rating; in total, the Continental gained nearly 5 inches in length.

As a counterpart to the Continental Town Car, a two-door Continental Town Coupe was introduced. In a similar fashion as the Town Car, the Town Coupe was distinguished by its padded vinyl top.

For 1974, the Lincoln Continental was given a new grille, moving from an egg-crate style to a waterfall design. As part of federal regulations, a 5-mph bumper was added to the rear, leading to a redesign of the rear bumper; the taillamps were moved from inside the bumper to above it.

1975–1979
After 5 years on the market, Lincoln made an extensive revision to the Continental. Coinciding with the 1975 introduction of the Mercury Grand Marquis, Lincoln and Mercury sought to better visually differentiate their two flagship model lines, in spite of their mechanical commonality. As part of the revision, the Lincoln Continental was able to adopt a greater degree of styling commonality with the Continental Mark IV. For 1975, the exterior of the Lincoln Continental underwent a major revision. Although the body below the beltline saw only minor change with the taillights redesigned with vertical units, the roofline was completely restyled. To separate itself from the Mark IV, the two-door Continental/Town Coupe adopted a fully pillared roofline with a square opera window in the C-pillar. In place of the pillared hardtop shared with the Mercury Marquis and Ford LTD, the four-door Continental/Town Car adopted a wide B-pillar; to distinguish itself from the Cadillac Sixty Special Brougham; Town Cars were given the oval opera window introduced on the Mark IV. Along with the styling upgrades, 1975 Lincolns received substantial upgrades to the braking system. Designed by Bendix, the Lincoln Continental became one of the first American cars equipped with a 4-wheel disc brake system (as an option). To further improve the emissions performance of the 460 V8, the engine was fitted with catalytic converters, ending its compatibility with leaded regular gasoline.

For 1976, the exterior remained essentially the same as the year before (marking the first carryover styling year for Lincoln since 1963). In an effort to price the Continental more competitively, Lincoln deleted a number of previously-standard features, making them extra cost options.

For 1977, the Lincoln Continental would undergo another exterior revision. The wide Mercury-style grille was replaced by a narrower, Rolls-Royce-style radiator grille, taking cues from the outgoing Mark IV grille. Variations of such grilles would continue to front Lincolns through 1997. In another trim revision, the "Continental" script was removed from the rear fenders.

For 1978, the dashboard was updated for the first time, as the Lincoln Continental adopted a revised version of the Mercury Grand Marquis dashboard. In addition to increasing parts commonality, the update was done to save weight; the plastic-frame Mercury dashboard was lighter than the previous steel-frame version. In a similar move, Lincoln redesigned the rear fender skirts, adopting a version that covered less of the rear wheels. Alongside the optional sliding glass sunroof, a fixed glass moonroof with an interior sunshade was introduced (for the first time since the 1955 Ford Skyliner).

For 1979, the interior underwent further updating, as the Mercury-sourced dashboard received additional wood trim. The 460 V8 was deleted from the Lincoln/ Mark V model line entirely, leaving the 400 V8 as the sole engine.

Special editions
Throughout its production, the fifth-generation Lincoln Continental was offered with several special-edition option packages. In contrast to the Mark series, the fifth-generation Continental was not offered with any Designer Series editions.

Golden Anniversary (1971)
To commemorate the 50th anniversary of Lincoln in 1971, a Golden Anniversary Town Car was offered as a limited-edition option package for the Lincoln Continental. Although technically available in any of 25 paint colors available for any Lincoln, the Golden Anniversary Town Car featured an exclusive gold moondust metallic paint color as an option; 1,040 examples were painted in the gold moondust color.  All examples were given a color-keyed vinyl roof with a color-keyed leather interior (with trim exclusive to the package).

Other features included a commemorative brochure, a glove compartment vanity mirror, a commemorative plaque on the dashboard, and keys plated in 22 carat gold presented in a jewelry box.  In total, 1,575 examples were produced; initial production was 1,500 vehicles, with an additional 75 produced exclusively for employees within Ford Motor Company.

Williamsburg Edition (1977–1979)
From 1977 to 1979, Lincoln sold a Williamsburg Edition Continental Town Car. Intended as a cosmetic option package, the Williamsburg Edition was the only Continental or Town Car sold with two-tone paint; the edition also standardized a number of options. Along with two-tone paint, the Williamsburg Edition also included a full vinyl roof, pinstriping, power vent windows, lighted vanity mirrors, and 6-way twin "Comfort Lounge Seats".

For 1977, the option package was designed as one of the most conservative versions of the Town Car, without any opera windows or coach lights fitted to the roofline. For 1978 and 1979, the opera windows and coach lights were added to the roofline.

Collector's Series (1979) 
To commemorate the end of production of the Lincoln Continental and Continental Mark V while denoting them as the final "traditional" full-size American sedans and coupes, Lincoln offered a Collector's Series for both the Continental and Mark V. As with its Mark V counterpart, the Continental Collector's Series was equipped with essentially every available feature as standard equipment. Only four options were available for the Collector's Series: a power moonroof, 40-channel CB radio, "Sure-Track" anti-lock brakes, and a plush Kashmir velour interior (in lieu of leather). The Continental Collector's Series could reach $18,000 when fully equipped; within Ford Motor Company, it was only surpassed by its $22,000 Mark V Collector's Series counterpart at the time.

Along with four options, the Continental Collector's Series was produced in four colors: dark blue, white and limited-issue medium blue (197 built) and light silver (125 built) with a dark-blue vinyl top.

Production

Sixth generation (1980)

With the impending adoption of federal fuel-economy standards (CAFE) making the large cars of the 1970s a potential financial threat to Ford Motor Company, for 1979, Ford and Mercury full-size sedans underwent extensive downsizing; Lincoln became the final American brand to release to a downsized model range for the 1980 model year.  In another extensive model change, the Lincoln Continental became the counterpart of the newly introduced Continental Mark VI, the first Mark series model range smaller than its predecessor.

While lagging behind Cadillac for three years to downsize its model range, the redesign of the Continental provided Lincoln with the best year-to-year fuel economy improvement (38%) in Ford history.  Alongside a massive reduction of curb weight, the introduction of a 4-speed overdrive transmission enabled Lincoln to surpass its competitors, switching from the brand with the worst 1979 CAFE rating to the most fuel-efficient full-size car sold.

One of the most technologically advanced vehicles ever sold by Ford at the time, the 1980 Continental introduced a standard 4-speed automatic overdrive transmission, electronic fuel injection with computer-controlled engine management (EEC-III), digital instrument panel, and trip computer (measuring real-time and average fuel economy figures and driving range).  Throughout the decade, many of the features would make their way into many other Ford and Lincoln-Mercury vehicles.

The sixth generation of the Lincoln Continental would be offered only for 1980.  To eliminate saturation of the Lincoln model line, the sixth-generation Continental was re-released as the Lincoln Town Car for 1981 (effectively lasting through the 1989 model year).   Following the 1980 withdrawal of the Versailles and the introduction of the Town Car, the Continental nameplate was shifted to the mid-size segment for the 1982 model year (skipping the 1981 model year).  While never officially announced as the replacement for the Versailles, the 1982 Continental became the Lincoln competitor for the Cadillac Seville.  The Mark VI ended its model run after the 1983 model year and was replaced by the Mark VII, a far different vehicle.

Chassis
Central to the redesign was the adoption of the all-new Ford Panther platform, shared with the Ford LTD and Mercury Marquis. While retaining the body-on-frame layout of its predecessor and using a rear-wheel drive powertrain, the Panther platform made major engineering changes to lower curb weight. In addition, the chassis itself was smaller in several key dimensions. While only approximately 2 inches narrower, the 1980 Continental shed 10 inches of its wheelbase and 14 inches in length. In losing nearly 1000 pounds of curb weight, the 1980 Continental came within 200 pounds of the curb weight of the "compact" Lincoln Versailles.

In its focus on fuel economy, the Panther platform was developed without the use of the 400 or 460 V8s powering full-size Lincoln-Mercurys throughout the 1970s. In their place was the first fuel-injected V8 engine produced by Ford Motor Company. Based on the 302 cubic-inch small block V8, the newly christened 129 hp 5.0L V8 (rounded up from its true 4.9L displacement) was the first "metric-displacement" American Ford engine. As an option, a 140 hp carbureted 351 cubic-inch Windsor V8 was available. In place of the C6 3-speed automatic transmission was an all-new 4-speed Automatic Overdrive Transmission (AOD). Developed under the name Ford Integral Overdrive (FIOD), this industry-first transmission featured both a mechanically-engaged overdrive (0.67/1 ratio) fourth gear and third and fourth-gear torque converter lock-up.

The new Panther platform allowed for changes in the new Continental's suspension geometry and many improvements were made to the power steering. With this, and the reduced overall size, the 1980 Lincoln Continental was able to retain the traditional big car ride and feel, while offering a major enhancement to its handling. Compared to the 1980 Continental's GM and Chrysler counterparts and the 1979 Lincoln models, the new car offered more agile maneuvering, as well as a reduced turn diameter by over 8 feet (compared to the 1979 Lincoln Continental).

Body
Although sharing a common platform and powertrain with the Ford LTD and Mercury Marquis, the Lincoln Continental was well differentiated from its counterparts; no visible body panels were common between the three vehicles. In contrast, the 1980 Continental was positioned as the base model of the Lincoln model line; the Continental Town Car/Town Coupe made its return as the top-trim model. As all Continentals wore padded roofs, Continental Town Cars were largely differentiated by two-tone paint. Lincolns were differentiated from Continental Mark VIs by their exposed headlights and full-width taillamps (instead of a "Continental spare tire trunk"). Two-door Lincolns can be distinguished from Mark VI two-doors with their "notchback" roofline; they share a common wheelbase with four-door Lincolns.

Production

Seventh generation (1982–1987)

Following the downsizing and adoption of the Panther platform for the 1980 model year, the Lincoln division was faced with a critical issue. After the discontinuation of the compact Lincoln Versailles early in 1980, Lincoln was left with two full-size sedans. Although each was brand-new for the model year, the Lincoln Continental and Continental Mark VI were functionally identical vehicles. Aside from the "Continental tire" trunklid, unique rear quarter panels, different taillamps and hidden headlamps of the Mark VI, the two vehicles offered little differentiation.

The Continental made its return in early 1981 as a 1982 model. To further separate Continental from the Town Car, Lincoln designers shifted the Continental nameplate into the mid-size segment. Only offered as a four-door sedan, the Continental was styled with a "bustle-back" rear end and marketed to compete directly with the Cadillac Seville and the Imperial. Using the lessons learned from Lincoln Versailles and badge engineering, Lincoln stylists took great care to differentiate the expensive Continental from the Ford Granada and Mercury Cougar sedans sharing the Ford Fox platform with it; unlike the Versailles, no visible body panels were shared. The Continental shared its wheelbase and powertrain with the Continental Mark VII introduced for the 1984 model year.

Beginning with the 1981 model year, all manufacturers were required to use a 17 character VIN-code. The first three digits are the World Manufacturer Identifier which gives the make of the car. 1982–1985 Continental 4-door sedans have the separate VIN-code 1MR which designates Continental as the make instead of 1LN as Lincoln (as is the Town Car). Although the VIN designated Continental as the make, all Continentals carried Lincoln badging on the right side of the decklid.

In 1986, the situation was clarified by Ford Motor Company as the Continental was reassigned the 1LN VIN-code to designate Lincoln as the make.

Chassis
Shifting from the Ford Panther platform to the Ford Fox platform, the Continental became a mid-size car for the first time. In its redesign, the Continental would lose nearly 9 inches in wheelbase and 18 inches in length, along with over 400 pounds of weight. Although it would be the shortest-wheelbase Lincoln ever (at the time), the Continental would use a stretched 108.5" wheelbase version of the Fox platform used by the Ford Thunderbird and Mercury Cougar. In marked contrast to its Cadillac Seville competitor, which switched to a front-wheel drive GM platform, the Continental retained the use of rear-wheel drive.

The 1982 Continental was fitted with two different engines. The standard engine was a 131 hp carbureted version of the 5.0L V8. At no cost, a 3.8L V6 (shared with the Ford Thunderbird and Mercury Cougar) was an option; it was the first non-V8 Lincoln since 1948. Both engines were discontinued for the 1983 model year, replaced by the fuel-injected 5.0L V8 from the Town Car. All three engines were fitted with the 4-speed Ford AOD overdrive transmission. As a response to the diesel engine options available in Cadillacs and a number of European luxury brands, Lincoln introduced an optional 114-hp 2.4L turbodiesel inline-6 sourced from BMW (with a ZF 4-speed automatic transmission) for 1984. With only 1,500 sold, the diesel-powered Continental was rarely ordered and discontinued after the 1985 model year. The seventh-generation introduced two features as industry firsts: gas-charged shock absorbers and self-sealing tires.

Body 

For the first time on a Lincoln-badged Continental, its namesake "Continental spare tire trunk" seen on the Mark Series was used as a decklid design feature. In addition, the decklid was lettered "CONTINENTAL" instead of "LINCOLN" (as was the Versailles, the first Lincoln to do so). As Ford Motor Company intended for the  Continental to compete against the Cadillac Seville, the rear half of the car was designed with a sloping "bustle-back" decklid, drawing inspiration from the Lincoln-Zephyr of the late 1930s. The decklid design of the Continental proved less extreme than that of the Seville. The addition of a horizontal brushed-chrome strip that ran along each side of Continental, along with plentiful two-tone color combinations, gave it a more conventional appearance in comparison to the Cadillac.

Coinciding with the introduction of the two-door Continental Mark VII, the Continental was given a styling update for the 1984 model year. The body was fitted with flush-fitting front and rear bumpers and revised taillamps. While not fitted with the composite headlights of the Mark VII, the front fascia of the Continental was revised with an angled grille flanked by recessed quad headlamps and larger wrap-around marker lights incorporating cornering lamps, which made it more aerodynamic looking. On the inside, the doors and dashboard were fitted with satin-black trim (accented with low-gloss genuine walnut veneer for the 1986 model year only). Other changes through the rest of the production run were primarily limited to paint colors and upholstery pattern details. The car continued thereafter with few changes. All models were also fitted with Ford's door-mounted Keyless Entry System, not to be confused with a Remote Keyless Entry System.

Trim
For 1982, the Continental was offered in base trim, Signature Series, and Givenchy Designer Series trim. Givenchy was offered for all 6 years. For 1983, the Signature Series trim was absorbed by the base or standard model. The Signature Series trim was given to the Town Car and Mark VI instead; the Valentino Designer Series was added for 1983-1985 as a second Designer Series choice. After the 1985 model year, the Valentino Designer Series was discontinued in favor of the Givenchy Series as the sole Designer Series offering. The last two years, 1986 and 1987, choices paired down to just 2 trims: base and Givenchy. Including many additional standard features, the Signature Series, Valentino, and Givenchy Designer Series Continentals added $3,100 (equivalent to $8,700 in 2021) to $3,500 (equivalent to $9,800 in 2021) to the price of a standard model. Fully optioned Signature and Givenchy models would top out at over $26,500 (equivalent to $74,400 in 2021).

Production

Eighth generation (1988–1994)

By the late 1980s, the luxury segment in which the Continental competed had changed drastically from a decade before. In addition to traditional competitors Cadillac and Chrysler, the Continental now competed against Mercedes-Benz, BMW, and Audi and eventually the top-of-the-line vehicles of Acura, Lexus, and Infiniti. In anticipation Lincoln had chosen to completely reinvent the Continental, starting with the development of eighth generation model in the 4th quarter of 1981.

The 1988 Continental went on sale on December 26, 1987 and shared its unibody chassis with the Ford Taurus and Mercury Sable, using its own unique body and interior design and riding a three-inch longer wheelbase. This Continental became the first front-wheel drive Lincoln and the first Lincoln since 1948 sold without an available V8 engine. As part of a more conservative exterior, the sloping  "Continental trunklid" was deleted. Although four inches longer, it was 170 pounds lighter than its predecessor. For the first time since 1980, the Continental closely matched its Cadillac Sedan de Ville counterpart in size.

By interior volume the Continental was the largest front-wheel drive car sold in 1988, and was recognized by Car and Driver on its 1989 Ten Best list. Power was provided by a 140 hp 3.8L Essex V6 newly introduced to the Taurus/Sable for 1988. An exclusive feature to the Continental was adaptive air-ride suspension and variable assist power steering was standard. In 1990 (MY 1991), engine output was revised to 155 hp, and to 160 hp for MY 1993. All Continentals were equipped with a 4-speed overdrive automatic transmission.

Average annual sales for the eighth generation Continental were more than double that of the previous generation model and helped the Lincoln brand to achieve record total sales in 1989 and again in 1990.

Body
The Continental adopted much of the aerodynamic design language of the Taurus, but has a more upright C-pillar, chrome grille, longer deck.  The redesign of the sloping trunklid increased trunk space from 15 to 19 cubic feet (nearly matching the Town Car).

In October 1988 for the 1989 model year, a redesigned dashboard was introduced to accommodate dual air bags. This unprecedented move made the Ford Motor Company the first US automaker to offer airbags as standard equipment for both the driver and front passenger (the second automaker worldwide after Porsche's 1987 944 Turbo). In 1989 for the 1990 model year, a minor exterior update featured a new grille, hood ornament, and taillights. 

In late 1993 for MY 1994, the Continental received another facelift, with revised bumpers, rocker moldings, and bodyside moldings. Exterior trim was redesigned including a restyled argent-colored grille, redesigned taillamps, revised decklid trim, and the Lincoln nameplate is moved onto the grille and taillamps. The bucket seat option received a redesigned steering wheel.

Trim
As part of the redesign, Lincoln simplified the trim lineup; only standard (later named "Executive") and Signature Series remained. 
For the first time since 1981, 6-passenger seating made its return. Leather seats were standard (with velour available as a no-cost option). Major options included a compact disc player, InstaClear electrically heated windshield (1988–1992), JBL sound system, power glass moonroof, keyless entry, anti-theft alarm system, cellular phone (starting MY 1990), three-position memory seat, and choice of wheels. For model year 1993 (1992 production), an "Individual Seats" group was available which ditched the usual chrome column shifter and 50/50 "comfort lounge" split bench seating (and 6-passenger capacity) for a center console with floor shifter (a Continental first), storage armrest, cup holder, and 5 seats. 1994 was the last year that the Continental was offered in Executive and Signature Series trims. An Executive Touring package was also available.

Special edition

50th Anniversary Edition (1990)
A 50th Anniversary Edition Continental Signature Series was offered during MY 1990 to commemorate the 50th anniversary of the model. It featured "50th Anniversary" badging, geometric spoked aluminum wheels with unique center hub ornaments, titanium exterior paint with unique red/blue accent striping, and two-toned interior.

Production

Ninth generation (1995–2002)

For the 1995 model year, the Continental was substantially restyled inside and out — and launched on December 26, 1994;.  The new Continental used styling cues from the Lincoln Contempra concept car, unveiled in early 1994.

Production commenced at Wixom Assembly in November 1994. While the body was all-new, the Continental shared underpinnings with the previous generation. In a departure from the previous generation, the Continental received V8 engine for the first time since 1987 and more closely matched the Northstar V8 engine that Cadillac was using at the time. The 1995-2002 Continental was the only production vehicle in which a Ford Modular family engine was mounted transversely, and the only one to use it in a front wheel drive application. The base price for the 1995 Continental at launch was $40,750.

The sole engine for the Continental was the Modular/InTech 32v DOHC 4.6L V8 shared with the Lincoln Mark VIII, but slightly de-tuned for front wheel drive use. It produced  and  torque;  was reached in 7.2 seconds. Inside, the Continental featured a plush leather interior with many amenities and advanced electronics for the time. Some of the options included JBL sound system, 6-CD changer, power moonroof, heated seats, onboard cellular phone, anti-theft alarm system, traction control, and chrome wheels. As before, buyers could choose between five and six-passenger seating, offering Bridge of Weir leather on upper trim packages.

1995 and 1996 Continentals had air ride suspension on all four wheels while the 1997 model had rear air suspension and traditional steel coil springs up front. An increasingly competitive luxury market and decontenting of the 1997 Continental saw its base price decreased by 10% that year.

1998 facelift

The Continental was updated again in late 1997 for 1998 with redesigned front and rear end styling. The front-end also held a strong family resemblance to the newly redesigned 1998 Town Car. Also new for 1998 was a dashboard redesign, though still keeping the reflective dash cluster. Despite these notable changes, pricing on the Continental was up only slightly over the 1997 model which itself had seen a price reduction from the year before.

For 1999, the Continental once again saw only a modest price increase to MSRP $38,525 — the same price as the Town Car. The Continental offered buyers front wheel drive, while the Town Car remained rear wheel drive, and was joined by the slightly smaller Lincoln LS. Six-passenger capability was still available via the no-charge option of a split-bench front seat and column shifter. Also available on the 1999 Continental was the "RESCU package" (Remote Emergency Satellite Cellular Unit) which included Global satellite positioning (similar to GM's "OnStar"), 3-channel HomeLink compatible garage door opener mounted in the driver's sun visor, voice-activated cellular telephone, and the Alpine audio system (which included a digital sound processor, subwoofer amplifier, and additional speakers). One could also opt for the 6-disc CD changer, heated front seats, and a tinted glass power sunroof with sliding shade.

New for 1999 was an extra-cost "Luxury Appearance Package" that included a wood-trimmed steering wheel and shift knob with unique two-tone seat trim and floor mats inside, and chrome alloy wheels and a special grille up front. Other available packages were the "Driver Select System" which included a semi-active suspension, selectable ride control, steering wheel-mounted controls for the audio and climate systems, automatic day/night outside mirrors, the "Memory Profile System" that recalled power steering assist and ride control settings for two drivers, and the "Personal Security Package" which included special run-flat tires mounted on polished alloy wheels, low tire pressure alert system, and universal garage door opener.

Between the 2000 and 2002 model years, changes to the Continental remained relatively minor as production of the model eventually came to an end. In 2000, various safety features became standard including child seat-anchor brackets, emergency trunk release, and "Belt Minder" system. In 2001, the universal garage door opener was now standard. A new Vehicle Communication System (VCS) featuring hands-free voice activated phone, Safety and Security Services (SOS), information services, and route guidance assistance was optional for 2002.

Special editions

Diamond Anniversary Edition (1996)
To commemorate the 75th anniversary of Lincoln, a Diamond Anniversary Edition of the Continental was offered as an option package. The package included "Diamond Anniversary" badging, leather seats, voice-activated cellular phone, JBL audio system, auto electrochromatic dimming mirror with compass, and traction control.

Spinnaker Edition (1996)
As a continuation of the version offered the year before on the Town Car, Lincoln offered a Spinnaker Edition of the 1996 Continental. The option package featured "Spinnaker Edition" badging, tri-coat paint, two-toned leather seats, and 16" spoked aluminum wheels.

Limited Edition (2001)
For 2001, a Limited Edition was offered, featuring unique leather interior with "Limited" embroidery, two-toned interior trim, wood steering wheel, 6-disc CD changer, and 16" spoked aluminum wheels. It was sold as a Greenbrier Limited Edition Continental in select markets.

Collector's Edition (2002)
To commemorate the end of the model run for 2002, a Collector's Edition was offered featuring a genuine walnut burl steering wheel, instrument panel, and side door trim, "CE" logos, platinum painted grille, 10-spoke chrome wheels, and more. In addition to the Continental's other exterior color choices, a CE-exclusive charcoal gray was also available. Approximately 2,000 were produced.

Sales

Discontinuation and replacement
After several years of declining sales, Lincoln announced that 2002 would be the last year for the Continental. Along with declining sales of the model line, Lincoln faced a significant model overlap as the Continental, LS V8, and Town Car competed in nearly the same price range. As the LS V8 was a mid-size sport luxury sedan and the Town Car was a full-size luxury sedan, the Continental was withdrawn, with the final ninth-generation vehicle rolling off the Wixom Assembly production line on July 26, 2002.

After 2002, the Continental was not directly replaced. For 2009, Lincoln introduced the MKS; while intended to replace the Town Car (which remained until 2011), the MKS was closer in length and width to the ninth-generation Continental and based on a front-wheel drive chassis (with all-wheel drive as an option). In place of a V8 engine, the MKS offered a twin-turbocharged V6 as an option. For the 2017 model year, the MKS was replaced by the new tenth-generation Continental.

Tenth generation (2017–2020)

In the fall of 2016, after a fourteen-year hiatus, the tenth generation Continental went on sale. Previewed by a namesake concept car at the 2015 New York Auto Show, the 2017 Lincoln Continental is the successor of the Lincoln MKS. The Continental was manufactured in Flat Rock, Michigan, alongside the Ford Mustang. This was the first Continental generation since 1958 that was not assembled at the Ford Motor Company Wixom Assembly Plant.

Production of the Continental ended on October 30, 2020, with no immediate plans for a replacement in the full-size sedan segment.

Chassis
The tenth-generation Lincoln Continental is based upon the Ford CD4 platform. Shared with the Ford Fusion (Mondeo) and Lincoln MKZ, the Continental shares an extended-wheelbase CD4 chassis with the seventh-generation Ford Taurus. At 117.9 inches (5.7 inches longer than the Fusion/MKZ), the Continental is the longest-wheelbase Lincoln sedan produced since 1979 with the exception of the long wheelbase L Town Cars. While front-wheel drive is standard, this generation marks the first use of all-wheel drive on a Lincoln Continental, but depending on trim, all-wheel drive is either optional or standard equipment.

While sharing its fundamental chassis underpinnings with the Lincoln MKZ, the Continental is powered exclusively by V6 engines. As a standard engine, a 305 hp 3.7L Ti-VCT V6, shared with the MKZ and MKS. As an option, a 335 hp 2.7L twin-turbocharged V6 is available, shared with the Lincoln MKX. At the top of the engine lineup, the Continental is fitted with a  3.0L twin-turbocharged V6; exclusive to the Continental and MKZ, the 3.0L engine is the highest-horsepower engine ever fitted to a production Lincoln car (Navigator SUV is available with  3.5L twin-turbo V6 ). All three engines are paired with a six-speed automatic transmission. When fitted with the 3.0L engine, all-wheel drive (with torque vectoring) is standard equipment.

Body
The tenth-generation Continental introduced a new front end design theme for the Lincoln division, shifting from the previous “bird-in-flight” split grille to a slightly recessed rectangular design. Standard equipment includes electrically latched doors (marketed as "E-Latch"), which also pulls the door closed. Interior door panels use a button near the door pull handle to unlatch the door; on the outside, the exterior door pulls are integrated into the beltline window trim, reminiscent of the third generation Ford Thunderbird.

In place of a console or column-mounted transmission shifter, control of the transmission was changed to "PRNDS" buttons mounted to the left of the infotainment/navigation touch screen. "S" represents "Sport mode", where the suspension, power steering, and transmission shifting are programmed for more spirited driving. While largely done in an effort to increase center console space, the layout is a similar approach to the Mercury, Chrysler and Packard designs of the mid-1950s (though the Continental is also fitted with paddle shifters as standard equipment). As an option, the Continental is available with either 13 or 19-speaker audio systems from the "Revel" division of Harman, distinguished by aluminum speaker grilles in the door panels. As with the Lincoln MKS, the Continental is fitted with adaptive cruise control and lane-keeping technology, as an option, the Continental offers a 360-degree camera system to produce a "virtual overhead view" of the vehicle.

Trim 
The Continental was offered in three standard trims, Premiere, Select, and Reserve — as well as a flagship Black Label trim. Bridge of Weir "Deepsoft" leather is used for upper-level trim (Select and Reserve). For its flagship Black Label trim level, vehicles have specially-coordinated exterior and interior appearance packages, including Chalet, Thoroughbred and Rhapsody Blue (exclusive to the Continental), the latter including blue leather appointed seats, Alcantara synthetic suede, shearling carpets, mesh and aluminized fiberglass accents.

Continental chief engineer Michael Celentino noted the difficulty of executing the blue interior: "Blue is a color on a knife edge, it has elements of green and red that are incredibly difficult to match on all the materials in an interior, especially when you consider the differing grain and gloss of materials ranging from the seats to the dashboard to the headliner. If you’re not careful, blue will ‘flop’ and look like those other colors when the light hits it from some angles. Ford designers ultimately gave a specific mix of hues to its colorant supplier: "with other colors, that supplier would tell parts makers what hue to mix to get the right result, but Rhapsody is so demanding that Ford shipped the completed mix to each supplier to get an identical shade on seats, plastic, carpet, dash, console, doors and headliner."

Lincoln design director David Woodhouse says. “Blue was Lincoln’s iconic color. The Ford family always had dark blue Continentals. MGM had a special blue created to match Liz Taylor’s eyes and gave her a car that color."

Special editions

80th Anniversary Coach Door Edition (2019)
To commemorate the 80th anniversary of the 1939 Lincoln Continental of Edsel Ford, Lincoln introduced a Coach Door Edition of the Continental.  The first Lincoln since the 1969 Continental to feature rear-hinged passenger doors, the vehicle is assembled as a standard Continental by Flat Rock Assembly.  Final assembly is completed by Cabot Coach Builders, a Massachusetts-based Ford QVM (Qualified Vehicle Modifier); the company performs a six-inch wheelbase extension (to fit the longer rear-hinged doors) with frame reinforcements.  The rear seat is reconfigured for a two-passenger seat with a full-length center console.

For the 2019 model year, 80 examples of the 80th Anniversary Coach Door Edition were produced and sold exclusively in the United States.  The first Lincoln vehicle with a base price over $100,000, all coach-door Continentals are Black Label trim with all-wheel drive and the 400 hp 3.0T twin-turbocharged V6 powertrain.

Coach Door Edition (2020)
For 2020, approximately 150 non-commemorative versions of the Coach Door Edition were produced.  Like the 2019 80th Anniversary Coach Door Edition, all were Black Label trim with all-wheel-drive and powered by the 400 hp 3.0T twin-turbocharged V6.

Sales

Discontinuation
Due to low sales and Lincoln's desire to focus on crossovers and SUVs, the Continental was discontinued after the 2020 model year.

Concept cars

2002 (Los Angeles Auto Show)

Unveiled at the 2002 Los Angeles Auto Show, the 2002 Lincoln Continental concept served as one of the first projects of Lincoln under PAG.  Combining traditional and advanced design features, the concept is a full-size sedan (at 214.3 inches long, it is an inch shorter than a 2002 Town Car) with design features intended to maximize passenger and cargo space.  The concept is powered by a  6.0L V12, paired to a 6-speed automatic transmission sending power to the rear wheels.

To ease passenger access, the Continental utilizes rear-hinged coach doors (in line with 1960s Lincolns); to further increase cabin space, a 136.6 inch wheelbase is used, effectively centering the passenger compartment.

While the 2002 concept never reached production, certain design elements were adapted in other Lincoln vehicles, as its roofline was adapted by the 2006 Lincoln Zephyr (later MKZ) and its front fascia was adapted by the 2007–2010 MKX.

2015 (New York Auto Show)

At the 2015 New York International Auto Show, Lincoln unveiled a concept vehicle, serving as a preview for the revival of the Lincoln Continental.  The concept vehicle was powered by the 3.0L twin-turbo V6 (its final drivetrain configuration was not revealed until its production).

Between the concept vehicle and the production 2017 Continental, were several differences; the concept vehicle was fitted with a glass roof and four-seat interior that were not included for production.  The production Continental has larger side view mirrors, larger air intakes in the front fascia, and red-colored brake lights.

References

External links

 Official website (2019) (archived)

Continental
Continental
Convertibles
Sedans
Flagship vehicles
Rear-wheel-drive vehicles
Full-size vehicles
Luxury vehicles
Front-wheel-drive vehicles
Mid-size cars
1930s cars
1940s cars
1950s cars
1960s cars
1970s cars
1980s cars
1990s cars
2000s cars
2010s cars
2020s cars
Ford Panther platform
Ford D186 platform
Limousines
Ford CD4 platform